This list of gastropods described in 2018 is a list of new taxa of snails and slugs of every kind that have been described (following the rules of the ICZN) during the year 2018. The list only includes taxa at the rank of genus or species.

Fossil gastropods

Marine gastropods

New species

Vetigastropoda

The following vetigastropod species were described in 2018:

Neogastropoda

The following neogastropod species were described in 2018:
 Adinassa barcai Horro, Schönherr & Rolán, 2018 
 Afonsoconus crosnieri Tenorio, Monnier & Puillandre, 2018
 Africonus freitasi Tenorio, Afonso, Rolán, Pires, Vasconcelos, Abalde & Zardoya, 2018
 Africonus josegeraldoi Cossignani & Fiadeiro, 2018
 Africonus padarosae Cossignani & Fiadeiro, 2018
 Coltroconus bianchii Petuch & Berschauer, 2018
 Conasprella lemuriana Monnier, Tenorio, Bouchet & Puillandre, 2018
 Conasprella gubernatrix Petuch & Berschauer, 2018
 Conus aequiquadratus Monnier, Tenorio, Bouchet & Puillandre, 2018
 Conus cazalisoi Cossignani & Fiadeiro, 2018
 Conus cymbioides Monnier, Tenorio, Bouchet & Puillandre, 2018
 Conus demisgeraldoi Cossignani & Fiadeiro, 2018
 Conus galeyi Monnier, Tenorio, Bouchet & Puillandre, 2018
 Darioconus rosiae Monnier, Batifoix & Limpalaër, 2018
 Jaspidiconus crabosi Petuch & Berschauer, 2018
 Jaspidiconus icapui Petuch & Berschauer, 2018
 Jaspidiconus itapua Petuch & Berschauer, 2018
 Jaspidiconus joanae Petuch & Berschauer, 2018
 Jaspidiconus keppensi Petuch & Berschauer, 2018
 Parabuccinum politum Pastorino, 2018
 Pionoconus easoni Petuch & Berschauer, 2018
Poremskiconus tourosensis Petuch & Berschauer, 2018

Neritimorpha
Nerita (Cymostyla) eichhorsti Krijnen, Gras & Vink, 2018
Nerita eichhorsti Krijnen, Gras & Vink, 2018

Nudibranchia
 Bohuslania matsmichaeli Korshunova, Lundin, Malmberg, Picton & Martynov, 2018
 Platydoris guarani Lima & Simone, 2018

New genera
 Bohuslania Korshunova, Lundin, Malmberg, Picton & Martynov, 2018
 Pictoconus Limpalaër & Monnier, 2018

Freshwater gastropods

Land gastropods

New species

Callina waldeni Groh & De Mattia, 2018
Georissa anyiensis Khalik, Hendriks, Vermeulen & Schilthuizen, 2018
Georissa bauensis Khalik, Hendriks, Vermeulen & Schilthuizen, 2018
Georissa kinabatanganensis Khalik, Hendriks, Vermeulen & Schilthuizen, 2018
Georissa muluensis Khalik, Hendriks, Vermeulen & Schilthuizen, 2018
Georissa sepulutensis Khalik, Hendriks, Vermeulen & Schilthuizen, 2018
Georissa silaburensis Khalik, Hendriks, Vermeulen & Schilthuizen, 2018
Hystricella microcarinata De Mattia & Groh, 2018
Libera kondoi Christensen, Khan & Kirch, 2018
 Minidonta opunohua Christensen, Khan & Kirch, 2018
 Nesodiscus cookei Christensen, Khan & Kirch, 2018
 Nesodiscus nummus Christensen, Khan & Kirch, 2018
Pilsbrylia dalli Simone, 2018
Wollastonia beckmanni De Mattia & Groh, 2018
Wollastonia falknerorum Groh, Neighbor & De Mattia, 2018
Wollastonia inexpectata De Mattia & Groh, 2018
Wollastonia jessicae De Mattia, Neighbor & Groh, 2018
Wollastonia klausgrohi De Mattia & Neighbor, 2018
Wollastonia ripkeni De Mattia & Groh, 2018
Zospeum percostulatum Alonso, Prieto, Quiñonero-Salgado & Rolán, 2018

New subspecies
Wollastonia jessicae jessicae De Mattia, Neighbor & Groh, 2018
Wollastonia jessicae monticola De Mattia, Neighbor & Groh, 2018

New genera
Wollastonia De Mattia, Neighbor & Groh, 2018

See also 
 List of gastropods described in 2017
 List of gastropods described in 2019

References

External links
 Taxa of gastropods described in 2018 in WoRMS database.
 

Gastropods
Molluscs described in 2018